Spain competed in the Junior Eurovision Song Contest 2022, which was held on 11 December 2022 in Yerevan, Armenia.

Background 

Prior to the 2021 contest, Spain had participated in the Junior Eurovision Song Contest on six occasions since its debut in the inaugural  contest. Spain won the  contest with the song "Antes muerta que sencilla", performed by María Isabel.

Before Junior Eurovision 
For the first time since , the Spanish broadcaster RTVE opted to use an open selection process to pick its representative. An assessment committee made up of RTVE professionals created a shortlist from the 95 submissions received between mid-August and September to perform in the second phase, a live casting held in Madrid. Carlos Higes was announced as the selected artist during the broadcast of the MasterChef Celebrity on 3 October 2022.

At Junior Eurovision 
After the opening ceremony, which took place on 5 December 2022, it was announced that Spain would perform eleventh on 11 December 2022, following North Macedonia and preceding United Kingdom.

Voting 

At the end of the voting, Spain finished in sixth place, coming in sixth with 59 points in the jury vote (including a maximum twelve points from the United Kingdom; Spain was also one of only two countries, along with Georgia, that managed to earn points from every national jury other than their own) and second with 78 points in the online vote. Spain awarded their twelve points to the host country, Armenia.

Detailed voting results
The following members comprised the Spanish jury:

-Xeinn (Benidorm Fest 2022 participant)

-Dangelo Ortega

-Sheila Blanco

-Levi Diaz

-Luna Berroa

References 

Junior
Spain
Junior Eurovision Song Contest